Agony in Paradise is a live album from the American death metal band Possessed. The recording took place on January 26, 1987, in Parma, Ohio. It was released by Agonia Records in 2004.

Track listing 

Possessed (band) albums
2004 live albums